Keith Coleman Racing was a NASCAR Busch Series team. It fielded the No. 23 and No. 26 cars for three seasons. The team was formed in 2004 by New Orleans native Keith Coleman and at the time bought the team's equipment from Holigan Racing and later from Bill Davis Racing.

KCR debuted in 2004 at the Mr. Goodcents 300 as the No. 26 LoveFifi.com Chevrolet Monte Carlo. Driver Mark Green qualified 26th and finished 34th in the race after suffering engine failure. He would run four more races that year for KCR, his best finish being a 23rd at Atlanta Motor Speedway. In the season-closing Ford 300, Green failed to qualify the No. 26, but KCR was able to get an entry in, the No. 50 Vassarette machine piloted by Jennifer Jo Cobb. Cobb crashed on the third lap of the race.

Despite her accident at Homestead, Cobb signed up to run the full 2005 Busch Series year with Coleman in the No. 26. NASCAR did not approve of her running at all tracks. Coleman originally asked Christi Passmore to fill in for Cobb in the races NASCAR did not allow Cobb to run, but that fell apart. Because Vassarette insisted that they would only sponsor a car with a woman behind the wheel, KCR selected Shawna Robinson as the team's driver for the full season. When she did not finish higher than 27th, Coleman removed her from the car, and she and Vassarette left the team during the summer. Mark Green returned to the No. 23, with BMAR joining as sponsor. He ran 16 races that year with KCR, his best finish being an 11th at Talladega. Meanwhile, KCR began operating a second car, the No. 26, in addition to the No. 23. 

In June 2005, it was announced that Kim Crosby would drive the new car part-time, with Boudreaux's Butt Paste and Vassarette as sponsors. Crosby finished 28th in her KCR debut at the Winn-Dixie 250, and then 39th a few weeks later at Pikes Peak. Due to lack of team performance, Crosby left the team towards the end of the season. In 2006, Chris Wimmer began the season the No. 23 car, but was released after the Pepsi 300. Marc Mitchell took over at Phoenix, but crashed during practice, forcing the team to miss the race. Carl Long drove the car beginning at the Federated Auto Parts 300 and had a best finish of 34th before he was released, and Brad Keselowski finished the season with the team with Ridley Motorcycles coming on board as sponsor. Eduardo Troconis attempted the race at Watkins Glen International, but failed to qualify. Keselowski was to drive the car full-time in 2007 with the Oklahoma Centennial Commission serving as the team's original primary sponsor, before Mactac Graphics became the team's new primary sponsor midway through the year. In July 2007, the team suspended operations, due to health problems from Coleman. The team officially closed later in the month.  An auction was held in 2007 to liquidate the assets of the team.

External links 
Keith Coleman Racing

Auto racing teams established in 2004
Sports clubs disestablished in 2007
Companies based in Kentucky
Defunct NASCAR teams
Lyon County, Kentucky
American auto racing teams
Defunct companies based in Kentucky